Charles Nelson Reilly (January 13, 1931 – May 25, 2007) was an American actor, comedian, director, and drama teacher known for his comedic roles on stage, film, and television. Reilly performed in the original Broadway casts of Bye Bye Birdie, Hello, Dolly!, and How to Succeed in Business Without Really Trying, for which he won the Tony Award for Best Featured Actor in a Musical. His television credits include The Ghost & Mrs. Muir and Match Game. A recording of his autobiographical one-man play Save It for the Stage: The Life of Reilly was adapted into a 2006 independent film.

Early life
Reilly was born January 13, 1931, in New York City in the Bronx, to an Irish-Catholic father and a Swedish Lutheran mother. When young, he would amuse himself by creating puppet theater, and his mother often told him to "save it for the stage".

At age 13, he survived the 1944 Hartford Circus Fire, which killed 167 people in Connecticut, and he was afraid to sit in an audience ever again. Because of the event's trauma, he rarely attended theater, stating that the large crowds reminded him of what happened that day. As he often stated on The Tonight Show and other such venues, even as the director of a play or stage production, he preferred to sit at the back of the house or the back of a balcony near the exits to preview his work, including one time where his leading lady's costume caught fire (but on recounting this episode to Johnny, Reilly assured him "but you know, these things always work out okay.")

Reilly developed a love of opera and wanted to become an opera singer. He entered the Hartt School of Music as a voice major, but abandoned this pursuit when he realized that he lacked the natural vocal talent to have a major career. However, opera remained a lifelong passion, and he was a frequent guest on opera-themed radio programs, including the Metropolitan Opera radio broadcasts. He directed opera productions for the Chicago Opera Theater, Dallas Opera, Portland Opera, San Diego Opera, and Santa Fe Opera. He was good friends with opera singers Renée Fleming, Rod Gilfry, Roberta Peters, and Eileen Farrell.

Career

Stage
Reilly made his film debut with an uncredited role in A Face in the Crowd (1957), directed by Elia Kazan, although most of his early career was spent on the stage. He was a regular performer in comic roles for several summer seasons in the 1950s at the Starlight Theatre in Kansas City, Missouri. Reilly appeared in many Off Broadway productions. His big break came in 1960 with the enormously successful original Broadway production of Bye Bye Birdie. In the groundbreaking musical, Reilly had a small onstage part and was Dick Van Dyke's understudy/replacement for the leading role.

In 1961, Reilly was in the original cast of another Broadway show, the Pulitzer prize-winning musical How to Succeed in Business Without Really Trying. For his memorable origination of the role of Bud Frump, Reilly earned a 1962 Tony Award for featured actor in a musical.

In 1964, Reilly was in the original cast of Hello, Dolly!, another successful Broadway show. For originating the role of Cornelius Hackl, Reilly received a second nomination for a Tony Award for performance by an actor in a featured role in a musical.

Television
Reilly kept active in Broadway shows but he became better known for his TV work, appearing regularly on television in the 1960s. He appeared as a Mystery Guest and was a panelist on the What's My Line? quiz show. In 1965 he appeared several times on The Steve Lawrence Show, which aired for a single season. Television commercials that he made throughout the 1960s, 1970s and 1980s included Excedrin, Bic Banana Ink Crayons and Purina Mills Dog Food.

From 1968 to 1970, he appeared as the bumbler Claymore Gregg on the television series The Ghost & Mrs. Muir, for which he received an Emmy nomination. He also appeared as a regular on The Dean Martin Show and had guest appearances on various television series, including McMillan & Wife, The Patty Duke Show, Here's Lucy, Rowan & Martin's Laugh-In, The Love Boat, and Love, American Style. In 1971, he appeared as the evil magician Hoodoo in Lidsville, a children's program on ABC.

Reilly was a frequent guest on The Tonight Show Starring Johnny Carson, appearing more than 100 times. He was a lively and reliable talk-show guest and lived within blocks of the Burbank studios where The Tonight Show was taped, so he was often asked to be a last-minute replacement for scheduled guests who did not make it to the studio in time.

Reilly was a fixture on game shows, primarily due to his appearances as a regular panelist on Match Game. He was one of the longest-running guests, and often engaged in playful banter with fellow regular Brett Somers (the two generally sat next to each other on the show—Somers in the upper middle seat and Reilly in the upper right seat). He typically offered sardonic commentary and peppered his answers with homosexuality-themed double entendres which pushed the boundaries of 1970s television standards.

During the taping of Match Game '74, Reilly left for a short time to film Hamburgers (1974) and to star in the Neil Simon play God's Favorite (December 1974 to March 1975). From 1975 to 1976, he starred in another live-action children's program titled Uncle Croc's Block, with Jonathan Harris. He was often a guest celebrity on the 1984 game show Body Language, including one week with Lucille Ball and another week with Audrey Landers.

Later career
From 1976, Reilly primarily taught acting and directing for television and theater, including directing Julie Harris (with whom he had acted in Skyscraper in 1965–66), who was portraying Emily Dickinson in her one-woman Broadway play The Belle of Amherst, by William Luce. In 1979, he directed Ira Levin's play Break a Leg on Broadway. Despite the previous year's success of Levin's Deathtrap, Break a Leg closed after one performance. Within days, Reilly appeared on The Tonight Show, joking and speaking at length about the show's failure, saying, "So [a play] can open and last six years, eight years... or two hours and five minutes." Reilly earned a 1997 Tony Award nomination as Best Director of a Play for the revival of The Gin Game, starring Julie Harris.

In 1988, Reilly hosted the syndicated game show Sweethearts, which ran for one season.

In 1990, he directed episodes of Evening Shade. Reilly also made guest appearances in the 1990s on The Drew Carey Show, The Larry Sanders Show, Family Matters, Second Noah, and as eccentric writer Jose Chung in the television series The X-Files ("Jose Chung's From Outer Space"), Millennium ("Jose Chung's Doomsday Defense"), and occasionally as the voice of the Dirty Bubble in the animated series SpongeBob SquarePants before he was replaced by Tom Kenny. Reilly was nominated for Emmy Awards in 1998 and 1999 for his performances in The Drew Carey Show and Millennium, respectively.

Reilly was a longtime teacher of acting at HB Studio, the acting studio founded by Herbert Berghof and made famous by Berghof and his wife, the renowned stage actress Uta Hagen. His acting students included Lily Tomlin, Bette Midler, and Gary Burghoff.

Reilly had a voice role in three films by Don Bluth: All Dogs Go to Heaven as Killer in 1989, Rock-a-Doodle as Hunch in 1991, and A Troll in Central Park as King Llort in 1994. In each one, he played the villain's dim-witted sidekick who reformed at the end.

Personal life
Magazine and newspaper profiles of Reilly throughout the 1970s and 1980s did not mention his personal life or sexuality. Years after the cancellation of Match Game, he revealed his homosexuality in his theatrical one-man show Save It for the Stage: The Life of Reilly.

Much like fellow actor and game-show regular Paul Lynde of the same era, despite Reilly's off-camera silence, he gave signals on-camera of a campy persona. In many episodes of Match Game, he lampooned himself by briefly affecting "YO!" in a deep voice, using the nickname "Chuck", and self-consciously describing how "butch" he was. Many years after his game show career ended, he mentioned in a 2002 interview with Entertainment Tonight that he felt no need to explain his jokes about Chuck and that he never purposely hid his homosexuality from anyone. Patrick Hughes, a set decorator and dresser, was Reilly's domestic partner; the two met backstage while Reilly appeared on the game show Battlestars, although their partnership was not revealed publicly. They lived together in Beverly Hills.

Reilly did appear on several episodes of the game show Tattletales with actress Elizabeth Allen as a couple, though their "relationship" was never discussed on the air.

Reilly was associated with the United States Coast Guard and made at least two films in conjunction with the Coast Guard. He regularly advertised National Safe Boating Week as a panelist on Match Game. Reilly died on May 25, 2007, the last day of National Safe Boating Week.

Despite sporting what appeared to be a full head of hair for most of the prime of his television career, Reilly was in fact bald, wearing a toupée throughout most of his appearances in the 1970s and 1980s. During the taping of Match Game '74, his toupée became a joke when Reilly had to go to New York City to have his toupée adjusted. During the taping of several episodes, Reilly was seen wearing different hats because his toupée was back in New York waiting for him to be fitted. This was the start of the long-running jokes on Match Game about his hair. He abandoned the toupée in the late 1990s and appeared bald in all of his subsequent public events. He dramatized the experience in his stage show The Life of Reilly. In one episode of Match Game PM, he took off his toupée and gave it to a bald contestant by putting it on his head. One can briefly see Reilly's bald head before he covers it up with a hat.

Final years and death

Reilly spent his later life primarily touring the U.S. directing theater and opera and offering audiences a glimpse into his background and personal life with a critically acclaimed one-man play chronicling his life, titled Save It for the Stage: The Life of Reilly. In 2004, his final two performances of his play in North Hollywood, California, were recorded as the basis of an autobiographical independent film titled The Life of Reilly.

Reilly was stricken with respiratory problems while filming The Life of Reilly and retired from directing and performing immediately after the final day of shooting in 2004. The movie premiered in March 2006 at the South by Southwest film festival, and Reilly's film performance was acclaimed. He cancelled his personal appearance at South by Southwest due to his illness, and by the time the film premiered, he had been hospitalized. Reilly died of complications from pneumonia at the UCLA Medical Center on May 25, 2007, and his body was cremated. That weekend, the Game Show Network dedicated its programming to Reilly, airing some of his funniest episodes of Match Game. His death was marked by tributes from many celebrities including Michael Gambon and Luke Wilson.

Select filmography

Film
 The Tiger Makes Out (1967) – Registrar
 Cannonball Run II (1984) – Don Don Canneloni
 The Wind in the Willows (TV) (1987) – Mr. Toad 
 Body Slam (1987) – Vic Carson
 All Dogs Go to Heaven (1989) – Killer
 Rock-a-Doodle (1991) – Hunch
 A Troll in Central Park (1994) – Llort
 Babes in Toyland (1997) – Humpty Dumpty
 An All Dogs Christmas Carol (1998) – Killer
 The First of May (1998) – Dinghy
 Gaydar (2002) – Uncle Vincent
 Tom and Jerry: Shiver Me Whiskers (2006) – Red Parrot Stan
 The Life of Reilly (2007)

Stage
 Bye Bye Birdie (1960–61) – Mr. Henkel/Albert Peterson's understudy
 How to Succeed in Business Without Really Trying (1961–65) – Bud Frump
 Hello, Dolly! (1964–70) – Cornelius Hackl
 Skyscraper (1965–66) – Roger Summerhill
 Private Lives (1968) -Director
 God's Favorite (1974–75) – Sidney Lipton
 The Belle of Amherst (1976) – Director
 Break a Leg (1979) – Director
 Charlotte (1980) – Josias von Stein
 The Nerd (1987–88) – Director
 The Gin Game (1997) – Director
 Exile in Jerusalem (1994) -Director at the Williamstown Theatre Festival w/Julie Harris & Dennis Boutsikaris

Television
 Car 54, Where Are You? (1962) – Hilton Hartford Harlow in "Occupancy August 1st"
 The Patty Duke Show (1963) – Basketball coach for local high school
 The Ghost & Mrs. Muir (1968–70) – Claymore Gregg
 It Takes Two (1969–70)
 Here's Lucy (1970) - Elroy P. Clunk, In 1 episode, "Lucy the Crusader"
 Arnie (1971–72)
 Lidsville (1971–73) – Horatio J. HooDoo
 $10,000 Pyramid (July 23–27, 1973, celebrity guest playing opposite Shani Wallis).
 Password Plus and Super Password (1979–82, 1984–89, approx.)
 Match Game (1973–82, 1990–91)
 It Pays to Be Ignorant (1973–74) – Regular panelist
 The Match Game-Hollywood Squares Hour (1983–84)
 Uncle Croc's Block (1975–76) – Uncle Croc
 The Flintstone Comedy Show (1980–82) – Frank Frankenstone
 Body Language (1984–85)
 Sweethearts (1988–89) – Host
 Goof Troop (1992) – Dutch Spackle
 Space Cats (1992–93) – D.O.R.C. (Disembodied Omnipotent Ruler of Cats)
 Designing Women (March 23, 1992) – "L.A. Story"
 Rugrats (April 11, 1993) – Edmund Haynes, actor and director
 The Pink Panther (1993) - Jules Parrot
 The Larry Sanders Show (1996) – Everybody Loves Larry, Season 5, Episode 1 - Himself
 All Dogs Go to Heaven: The Series (1996–99) – Killer
 The X-Files (1996) – Jose Chung ("Jose Chung's From Outer Space")
 Family Matters 1996 Season 6 Episode 6 Getting Buff – Mr. Veerland
 Millennium (1997) – Jose Chung ("Jose Chung's Doomsday Defense")
 Disney's Hercules: The Animated Series (1998) – King Minos
 The Drew Carey Show (1998–99) – Mr. Hathaway, in 2 episodes: "DrugCo" and "The Salon"
 SpongeBob SquarePants (2000) – Dirty Bubble

Video games
You Don't Know Jack Movies (1997) – himself
SpongeBob SquarePants: SuperSponge (2001) – Dirty Bubble
SpongeBob SquarePants: Lights, Camera, Pants! (2005) – Dirty Bubble

In popular culture
For Big Lizard in My Backyard, their 1985 debut album, Philadelphia punk band The Dead Milkmen recorded a song titled "Serrated Edge" that features numerous absurd references to Reilly as a Jesus figure and orgy centerpiece.

In 2001, Reilly was the subject of a sketch on Saturday Night Live, spoofing Inside the Actors Studio, and was portrayed by Alec Baldwin. A later Baldwin character, the Generalissimo from 30 Rock, mentions both Julie Harris and The Belle of Amherst, which Reilly had directed. A 2008 parody of Match Game on Saturday Night Live included Fred Armisen playing a Reilly-like character. In the sketch, the host is found murdered moments before the show's taping; the subsequent on-air police investigation reveals that he had been having a clandestine homosexual affair with the Reilly character. Baldwin briefly reprised his portrayal of Reilly in the 30 Rock episode "Live from Studio 6H" (West Coast airing), appearing on the "joke wall" in a parody of Rowan & Martin's Laugh-In.

"Weird Al" Yankovic wrote and recorded a tribute song titled "CNR", jokingly caricaturing Reilly with parodies of the internet phenomenon Chuck Norris Facts, with absurdities like winning the Tour de France "with two flat tires and a missing chain", or how "every day he'd make the host of Match Game give him a piggyback ride". This was part of Yankovic's digital Internet Leaks EP, and was included on the 2011 CD release Alpocalypse. The music video was released by JibJab on August 4, 2009. Yankovic again referenced Reilly within a sight gag present in the end credits of his 2022 spoof biopic Weird: The Al Yankovic Story which implies that Reilly engaged in career-long stalking of the fictionalized Yankovic.

In season two, episode one of The Life and Times of Tim, one character observes another acting a line from their play and says, "I saw Charles Nelson Reilly do that, and you did it better."

References

External links
 
 
 
 
 The Final Taxi podcast on Charles Nelson Reilly
 Charles Nelson Reilly on DVD, plus Alec Baldwin's SNL impression
 
 
 Interview with Charles Nelson Reilly by Bruce Duffie, April 17, 1988 (Mostly about directing opera, and stories about opera singers)

1931 births
2007 deaths
Male actors from Hartford, Connecticut
American game show hosts
American male comedians
American male film actors
American male musical theatre actors
American male stage actors
American male television actors
American male voice actors
American people of Irish descent
American people of Swedish descent
American gay actors
Deaths from pneumonia in California
Gay comedians
LGBT theatre directors
LGBT people from New York (state)
People from the Bronx
University of Hartford Hartt School alumni
Tony Award winners
LGBT people from Connecticut
Comedians from New York (state)
20th-century American male actors
21st-century American male actors
20th-century American comedians
21st-century American comedians
20th-century American singers
20th-century American male singers
20th-century LGBT people
21st-century LGBT people
American LGBT comedians